The Garvonesa is a cattle breed originating in Portugal.

Description

The coat is normally dark red or brown in colour.
The head and neck are normally very dark.
The Horns are typically developed, based on head-back and down, then up to frentee.

Characteristics

Extension

The breed region is circumscribed exclusively to the Southeast Portugal in Beja and Setubal district.

External links
http://autoctones.ruralbit.com/?rac=19&esp=1

Cattle breeds
Cattle breeds originating in Portugal